Evander is a masculine given name. It is an anglicization of the Greek name Εὔανδρος (lit. "good man", Latinized Evandrus). 
It has also been adopted as an anglicization of the Gaelic name Ìomhar (the Gaelic variant of the name Ivor).

People and mythological figures named Evander include:

Ancient world
 Evander (mythology), three figures in Greek or Roman mythology
 Evander (philosopher) (3rd century–2nd century BC), Greek philosopher and joint leader of the Platonic Academy at Athens with Telecles
 Evander of Beroea, first century sculptor

Modern era
 Evander da Silva Ferreira (born 1998), Brazilian footballer also known simply as Evander
 Evander Holyfield (born 1962), American retired world champion heavyweight boxer
 Evander Ziggy Hood (born 1987), American National Football League player
 Evander Kane (born 1991), Canadian National Hockey League player
 Evander M. Law (1836–1920), American Civil War Confederate general
 Evander Bradley McGilvary (1864-1953), American philosophical scholar
 Evander McNair (1820–1902), American Civil War Confederate brigadier general
 Evander Shapard (1897-1977), American World War I flying ace
 Evander Sno (born 1987), Dutch footballer
 Evander Berry Wall (1860–1940), New York City socialite and later American expatriate in France

Masculine given names